Claire or Clare Martin may refer to:

 Claire Martin (gymnast) (born 1998), French artistic gymnast
 Clare Martin (ice hockey) (1922–1980), Canadian NHL player
 Claire Martin (meteorologist), British-Canadian meteorologist, broadcaster, and environmentalist
 Claire Martin (singer) (born 1967), English jazz singer
 Claire Martin (writer) (1914–2014), Canadian author
 Clare Martin (born 1952), Australian politician